Thursday's Game (also known as The Berk) is a 1974 American made-for-television comedy film starring Gene Wilder and Bob Newhart, written by James L. Brooks and directed by Robert Moore.  Though filmed in 1971, it was originally broadcast April 14, 1974, on ABC.

In addition to Wilder and Newhart, Thursday's Game starred many actors familiar to 1970s television viewers including John Archer, Ellen Burstyn, Norman Fell, Cloris Leachman, Valerie Harper, Rob Reiner, Richard Schaal, Martha Scott and Nancy Walker. The film was lauded by critics for its perceptive look at adult relationships, and furthered James L. Brooks's reputation as a writer and producer.

Plot
Harry Evers and Marvin Ellison are long time friends who meet each Thursday to play poker and get away from their wives. After the weekly game breaks up over a disagreement, the two men decide to continue meeting for other activities, which leads to friendship and rivalry as the men's lives take on very different paths.

Cast
Gene Wilder as Harry Evers
Bob Newhart as Marvin Ellison
Ellen Burstyn as Lynn Evers
Cloris Leachman as Lois Ellison
Martha Scott as Mrs. Reynolds
Nancy Walker as Mrs. Bender
Valerie Harper as Ann Menzente
Rob Reiner as Joel Forester
Norman Fell as Melvin Leonard
Ric Mancini as Bartender

External links 

1974 television films
1974 films
1970s buddy comedy films
American buddy comedy films
Films set in New York City
Films directed by Robert Moore
Films produced by James L. Brooks
Films scored by Billy Goldenberg
Films with screenplays by James L. Brooks
ABC Motion Pictures films
ABC Movie of the Week
1970s English-language films
1970s American films